Ratchanon Chantananuwat (born 4 March 2007) is a Thai amateur golfer who won the Trust Golf Asian Mixed Cup on the Asian Tour as an amateur on 10 April 2022. He became the youngest golfer to win on a tour recognized by the Official World Golf Ranking at the age of 15 years and 37 days.

Amateur wins
2020 TJDT Invitational, Faldo Series Thailand Championship - Hua Hin

Source:

Professional wins (1)

Asian Tour wins (1)

1Mixed event with the Ladies European Tour

Team appearances
Southeast Asian Games (representing Thailand): 2021

References

External links

Ratchanon Chantananuwat
Amateur golfers
LIV Golf players
Ratchanon Chantananuwat
Southeast Asian Games medalists in golf
Competitors at the 2021 Southeast Asian Games
2007 births
Living people